Karakol is a lake in the Moiynkum District, Jambyl Region, Kazakhstan.

Although the lake water is somewhat bitter, it can be used for watering livestock grazing in the surrounding area.

Geography
It has a large eastern wing or bay that is shallower and dries seasonally. The shores are marshy and the bottom of the lake is muddy.

Karakol freezes in mid November and thaws in March. On average the water level rises right after the melting of the snows in the spring and decreases in the summer. There are many small lakes nearby.

See also
List of lakes of Kazakhstan

References

External links
Chu-Talas, Kazakhstan
Об утверждении перечня объектов государственного природно-заповедного фонда республиканского значения (On approval of the list of objects of the state natural reserve fund of republican significance)

Lakes of Kazakhstan
Jambyl Region
Chu (river)